Waverly is an unincorporated community located in the towns of El Paso and Rock Elm, Pierce County, Wisconsin, United States.

References

Unincorporated communities in Pierce County, Wisconsin
Unincorporated communities in Wisconsin